Thurston Armbrister (born December 25, 1992) is a former American football linebacker. He played college football at the University of Miami. He signed with the Jacksonville Jaguars as an undrafted free agent in 2015.

Early years
Armbrister was born in 1992 on Christmas morning in Hollywood, Florida as the third of five children. His family affectionately nicknamed him "Head" during his childhood due to his head being big in proportion to his body. Armbrister attended Hollywood Hills High School where he played safety. Armbrister also played basketball and ran track and field in high school.

College career
Armbrister signed with the University of Miami as late as June 2011 and joined its practice squad as a true freshman. He began his college career in his sophomore year during the 2012 season and went on to play in all the games until his senior year during the 2014 season. While at the University of Miami, Armbrister majored in exercise physiology with a back-up plan to start a career as a physical therapist.

Professional career

Jacksonville Jaguars
On May 2, 2015, Armbrister signed with the Jacksonville Jaguars as an undrafted free agent following the conclusion of the 2015 NFL Draft. On September 3, 2016, he was released by the Jaguars.

Detroit Lions
On September 4, 2016, Armbrister was claimed off waivers by the Lions.

On September 2, 2017, Armbrister was waived by the Lions and was signed to the practice squad the next day. He was promoted to the active roster on September 30, 2017. He was waived on October 11, 2017 and was re-signed to the practice squad. He was released on November 29, 2017, but re-signed two days later.

New York Giants
On January 9, 2018, Armbrister signed a futures contract with the New York Giants. He was waived/injured on August 20, 2018 due to a hamstring injury and was placed on injured reserve. He was released on October 2, 2018.

Arizona Cardinals
On November 28, 2018, Armbrister was signed to the Arizona Cardinals practice squad, and promoted to the active roster two days later. He was placed on injured reserve on December 11, 2018.

On February 20, 2019, Armbrister was waived by the Cardinals.

Tampa Bay Vipers
Armbrister signed with the XFL's Team 9 practice squad during the regular season. He was signed off of Team 9 by the Tampa Bay Vipers on March 9, 2020. He had his contract terminated when the league suspended operations on April 10, 2020.

Personal life
Armbrister has an older brother Terrence Ebagua who was a walk-on tight end at Florida State and went on to play in the Professional Indoor Football League. Armbrister had a younger sister born a year after him, who died at age 3.

References

External links
Thurston Armbrister at NFL.com

1992 births
Living people
People from Hollywood, Florida
Armbrister, Thurston
American football linebackers
Miami Hurricanes football players
Jacksonville Jaguars players
Detroit Lions players
New York Giants players
Arizona Cardinals players
Team 9 players
Tampa Bay Vipers players